Huba Vajda (born 5 March 2000) is a Hungarian handball player who plays for Balatonfüredi KSE and the Hungarian national team.

Career

National team
He played for the first time on November 4, 2020, in the Hungarian national team in Veszprém against Spain. He was included in the large squad of the 2022 European Men's Handball Championship, but in the end he will not become a member of the narrow squad.

Honours

Club
Balatonfüredi KSE
Magyar Kupa
: 2019

Veszprém KKFT Felsőörs
Magyar Kupa
: 2022

Individual
 Hungarian Adolescent Handballer of the Year: 2016

References

External links
 Huba Vajda at EHF 
 
 

Hungarian male handball players
Living people
2000 births
Sportspeople from Győr